The VMI Keydets basketball teams represented the Virginia Military Institute in Lexington, Virginia. The program began in 1908, and played their games out of Cormack Field House, nicknamed "The Pit". The Keydets were members of the Southern Conference. Their primary rival is The Citadel.

1959–60

|-
|colspan=7 align=center|1960 Southern Conference men's basketball tournament

1960–61

|-
|colspan=7 align=center|1961 Southern Conference men's basketball tournament

1961–62

|-
|colspan=7 align=center|1962 Southern Conference men's basketball tournament

1962–63

|-
|colspan=7 align=center|1963 Southern Conference men's basketball tournament

1963–64

|-
|colspan=7 align=center|1964 Southern Conference men's basketball tournament

|-
|colspan=7 align=center|1964 NCAA Division I men's basketball tournament

1964–65

|-
|colspan=7 align=center|1965 Southern Conference men's basketball tournament

1965–66

|-
|colspan=7 align=center|1966 Southern Conference men's basketball tournament

1966–67

1967–68

|-
|colspan=7 align=center|1968 Southern Conference men's basketball tournament

1968–69

|-
|colspan=7 align=center|1969 Southern Conference men's basketball tournament

References
 

VMI Keydets basketball seasons